Palio amakusana is a species of sea slug, a nudibranch, a shell-less marine gastropod mollusc in the family Polyceridae.

Distribution 
This species was described from Japan.

Description
Palio amakusana is similar in shape to Palio dubia with a high-sided body and small rounded tubercles along the pallial margin. There are slightly smaller white tubercles scattered over the back and sides. It is translucent yellow-orange in colour. There is a prominent, white, extra-brachial appendage on either side of the gills.

References

Polyceridae
Gastropods described in 1960